Kelleigh Ryan (born January 15, 1987) is a Canadian Olympic fencer.

Career
Ryan won a silver medal at the 2011 Pan American Games and a gold medal at the 2015 Pan American Games in Toronto, both in the team event.

She has also participated in the Pan American Fencing Championships where she won silver medals in the foil team event every year from 2008 to 2019, silver medals in the individual event in 2014 and 2018 and bronze medals in the individual event in 2016 and 2019.

Ryan represented Canada at the 2020 Summer Olympics.

She competed at the 2022 World Fencing Championships held in Cairo, Egypt.

References

1987 births
Living people
Canadian female foil fencers
Sportspeople from Ottawa
Pan American Games medalists in fencing
Pan American Games gold medalists for Canada
Pan American Games silver medalists for Canada
Fencers at the 2011 Pan American Games
Fencers at the 2015 Pan American Games
Medalists at the 2011 Pan American Games
Medalists at the 2015 Pan American Games
Fencers at the 2020 Summer Olympics
Olympic fencers of Canada
21st-century Canadian women